William Cecil Pery, 1st Baron Glentworth (26 July 1721 – 4 July 1794) was an 18th-century Anglican bishop in Ireland.

He was born on 26 July 1721, the son of Reverend Stackpole Pery and Jane Twigg, daughter of William Twigg, Archdeacon of Limerick, and educated at Trinity College, Dublin. His elder brother was Edmund Pery, 1st Viscount Pery and younger sister was Lucy Hartstonge the founder of what is now St John's Hospital.

He was Dean of Killaloe (1772-1780) and then Derry. Pery was nominated Bishop of Killala and Achonry on 7 January 1781 and consecrated on 18 February that year. He was translated to Limerick, Ardfert and Aghadoe on 13 May 1784. He was created Baron Glentworth, of Mallow in the Peerage of Ireland, in 1790 and died on 4 July 1794. William Street in Limerick is named after him, as were Cecil Street, Glentworth Street and Mallow Street.

Pery firstly married Jane Walcott, daughter of John Minchin Walcott, and following her death, married secondly Dorothea Lewis, daughter of William Lewis, Archdeacon of Kilfenora. He was succeeded in his title by his son, Edmund Pery, who was later made Earl of Limerick. His daughter, Hon. Eleanor Pery, married Sir Vere Hunt, 1st Baronet. She died in 1821.

References

1712 births
1794 deaths
Alumni of Trinity College Dublin
Deans of Killaloe
Deans of Derry
Bishops of Killala and Achonry
Ordained peers
Bishops of Limerick, Ardfert and Aghadoe
Barons in the Peerage of Ireland
Peers of Ireland created by George III
Members of the Irish House of Lords
18th-century Anglican bishops in Ireland
William